Nicolaes de Vree (1645–1702) was a Dutch Golden Age painter.

Biography
De Vree was born in Amsterdam.  According to Houbraken, he painted landscapes, flowers, thistles, and herbs. Houbraken had a hard time finding information about his character, though there were many who were willing to discuss his works. This was because he was not a very social man, and after forming a friendship with Jan Luyken, he became, like Luyken, a follower of Behmenism, based on the writing of the German mystic Jakob Böhme.

He was a pupil of Jan Wijnants and he is known for his landscapes. In 1696 he moved to Alkmaar and in 1697 he became a member of the Alkmaar Guild of Saint Luke.  He died in Alkmaar.

He was one of the painters who worked on the album of garden paintings for Agnes Block.

References

Nicolaes de Vree on Artnet

1645 births
1702 deaths
Dutch Golden Age painters
Dutch male painters
Painters from Amsterdam
Painters from Alkmaar